David John Lee (born 31 January 1946) is a former Archdeacon of Bradford in the Church of England Diocese of Leeds. On retirement as an archdeacon he was made archdeacon emeritus and given a co-ordinating role for mission resources in the diocese until his expected retirement in 2016.

Lee was educated at Fitzwilliam College, Cambridge and ordained after an earlier career as a schoolmaster in 1978. After a curacy at St Margaret's, Putney he became a Lecturer: firstly in Theology at the Bishop Tucker College in  Mukono, Uganda (1980–1986); and then in Missiology at Selly Oak College, Birmingham (1986–1991). He was Rector of Middleton and St Chad's Church, Wishaw from 1991 to 1996 when he became Director of Mission for the Diocese of Birmingham and a canon residentiary at the city's cathedral: posts he held until his appointment as an archdeacon.

Notes

1948 births
Alumni of Fitzwilliam College, Cambridge
Archdeacons of Bradford
Living people
Anglican Diocese of Leeds